Platte River State Park is a public recreation area encompassing  on the southern bluffs of the Platte River  west of Louisville, Nebraska. The state park has a relatively steep, rolling topography compared to the surrounding region, with much of it forested.

History
Vintage cabins from the earlier campgrounds are still in use.

Activities and amenities
Guided trail rides are offered in summer. Jenny Newman Lake provides fishing opportunities for those under 16 years of age and their adult supervisors. Paddleboats are offered for rent. The park has a visitor center, arts and crafts center, picnicking areas, ballfield, tent camping, tepees, and cabins. A rifle, trap, and archery shooting range is part of the Roger G. Sykes Outdoor Heritage Complex. 

In 2016, the state announced a $34 million program to upgrade visitor experiences at four public recreation areas in the Platte River Valley. The improvements announced for Platte River State Park include the addition of new mountain biking and other trails and improved river access for canoers and kayakers.

References

External links

Platte River State Park Nebraska Game and Parks Commission
Platte River State Park Map Nebraska Game and Parks Commission

Protected areas of Cass County, Nebraska
State parks of Nebraska
Protected areas established in 1982
1982 establishments in Nebraska